PAF Base M.M. Alam  is a Pakistan Air Force airbase located at Mianwali, in the Punjab province of Pakistan. The base is named after Muhammad Mahmood Alam.

History
Originally a World War II airstrip, it was decided that Mianwali would be upgraded into a satellite airbase for PAF Base Mushaf (then PAF Base Sargodha) during the 1965 Indo-Pak War to act as an alternate recovery airfield. The airbase became operational in October 1971 and was first commanded by Group Captain S. M. Dutta. Aircraft of different types, including the Shenyang F-6, were operated from the base during the 1971 Indo-Pak War. Pilots and anti-aircraft gunners of Mianwali airbase shot down 5 enemy aircraft during that conflict, the first three days of which the base came under regular attacks.

The airbase was again upgraded to a permanent operational airbase in August 1974, although construction of facilities was not completed for another three years. The first base commander was Wing Commander Sultan Muhammad. During November 1975, the No.1 Fighter Conversion Unit (FCU) was transferred to Mianwali airbase from PAF Base Masroor where it began fighter conversion training using the FT-5 dual-seat training aircraft. Over 500 fighter pilots have graduated since.

In November 1976, No.14 Squadron was transferred to Mianwali airbase for operational conversion of graduates of the No.1 Fighter Conversion Unit from dual-seat to the Shenyang F-6 single-seat fighter aircraft. When No.14 Squadron was selected to operate the F-16 in August 1986, it was transferred away from Mianwali airbase and replaced by No.25 Squadron. Further construction of facilities and transfer of units to the base took place during the 1980s.

On January 5, 2012, No 1 Fighter Conversion Unit re-equipped, after end of long and illustrious services rendered by veteran Chinese FT-5 fighter trainer aircraft. No 1 FCU, is now being re-equipped with modern state-of-the-art K-8P fighter trainer aircraft.

Air Chief Marshal Rao Qamar Suleman, Chief of the Air Staff, Pakistan Air Force was the Chief Guest at the occasion.
In this regard the advanced and focused training at No 1 FCU on K-8P aircraft would assist Pakistan Air Force to remain an air force second to none.

Base Commander

Renaming 
The airbase was renamed as "PAF Base M.M. Alam" on 20 March 2014 after the 1965 war veteran Muhammad Mahmood Alam.

References
 

Pakistan Air Force bases
Mianwali District
Military installations in Punjab, Pakistan